Aaron Cohen's Debt is a non-linear, fact based 1999 Israeli film starring Moshe Ivgy as Aaron Cohen, a father abruptly taken into custody at his birthday party by police for one child-support payment which he does not believe he owes. Despite his frail health and his daughter's frantic attempts to bail him out, Aaron is forced to spend the night behind bars. Indifferent guards, an over-crowded cell and an infected ulcer thrust Aaron into a Kafkaesque nightmare. The following morning he is found dead and a hurried investigation hopelessly struggles to make sense of what happened.

It was directed by Amalia Margolin and written by Alon Bar. Originally made for Israel Cable Programming ICP, it was released 4 January 1999 in Israel  and later the United States, Canada, France, Germany and Australia.

Awards 
2011 Silver Award at the California Film Awards, USA, for "Under Arrest" the American adaptation of "Aaron Cohen's Debt"
1999 Rockie Award for Best Made-For-TV Movie at the Banff World Television Festival, Canada
1999 Best Foreign Language Film nominee at the SXSW Film Festival, Austin, Texas, USA

See also
Alon Bar
Moshe Ivgy
Banff World Television Festival

External links 

Filmthreat.com reviews
Jewish Film Archive Online
Banff_Television_Festival Awards

1999 films
1990s Hebrew-language films
1999 drama films
Israeli drama films